The Wersing language, also known as Kolana after its primary dialect, is spoken in scattered settlements around the coast of Alor in Indonesia. Due to this settlement pattern, Wersing speakers are in contact with Abui and Kamang speakers and often have some competence in these languages. Though not closely related, it has cultural connections with Tukudede on the neighboring island of Timor.

Phonology

References

External links
 Wersing at The Language Archive

Languages of Indonesia
Alor–Pantar languages